Sinn Sisamouth (c. 1932 – c. 1976) was a Cambodian singer-songwriter active from the 1950s to the 1970s. Widely considered the "King of Khmer Music", Sisamouth, along with Ros Serey Sothea, Pen Ran, Mao Sareth, and other Cambodian artists, was part of a thriving pop music scene in Phnom Penh that blended elements of Khmer traditional music with the sounds of rhythm and blues and rock and roll to develop a Cambodian rock sound. Sisamouth died during the Khmer Rouge regime under circumstances that are unclear.

Biography

Early life
Sinn Sisamouth was born in Stung Treng Province, the son of Sinn Leang and mother Seb Bunlei. One or both of Sisamouth's parents were partially Lao. Most sources list his year of birth as 1935, though some list 1932 or 1933. Sisamouth's father was a soldier during the Colonial Cambodia period and also served as prison warden in Battambang Province. His father died when he was a child and his mother then remarried.

Sisamouth learned to play stringed instruments at the age of six or seven, and showed a natural singing talent. He was often invited to perform music at school functions. At about age 16 he graduated from primary school and moved to Phnom Penh to study medicine; this plan was apparently meant to please his parents when his true goal was to become a musician. He began composing his own songs around this time.

Sisamouth graduated from medical school around the time that Cambodia gained independence from France in 1953. He initially worked in a Phnom Penh hospital as a nurse, but was soon hired by the Cambodian national radio station as a singer with its band. Around this time, Sisamouth married his cousin Keo Thorng Gnu in an arranged marriage, and they eventually had four children.

Music career
While performing with the Cambodian national radio station, Sisamouth became a protege of Queen Sisowath Kossamak, mother of Head of State Norodom Sihanouk. The Queen invited Sisamouth to join the Vong Phleng Preah Reach Troap (the classical ensemble of the Royal Treasury) with which he performed at royal receptions and state functions. He also achieved hit songs on national radio around this time, first writing and performing songs based on traditional Khmer music. In the mid-1950s, the romantic ballad "Violon Sneha", composed by violinist Hass Salan, catapulted Sisamouth into stardom across Cambodia.

Sisamouth became known for his crooning voice, which has been likened to that of Nat King Cole, while his stage presence has been compared to that of Frank Sinatra. By the late 1950s, Sisamouth had established himself as the leading figure in an expanding Cambodian pop music scene. Norodom Sihanouk, a musician himself, encouraged the development of popular music in Cambodia. Initially, pop records from France and Latin America were imported into the country and became popular, inspiring a flourishing music scene based in Phnom Penh.

The music produced by Sisamouth and his contemporaries had become popular throughout the country; in 1965, Sisamouth's song "Champa Battambang" was the first content played on Khmer Republic Television. By the late 1960s and early 1970s, the Cambodian music scene was further influenced by Western rock and roll and soul music via U.S. armed forces radio that had been broadcast into nearby South Vietnam. This resulted in a unique sound in which Western pop and rock were combined with Khmer vocal techniques. Sisamouth was a leader of these trends, moving from traditional Khmer music and romantic ballads to Latin jazz, cha cha cha, agogo, and eventually psychedelic rock in which he employed younger rock musicians.

Sisamouth had become established as Cambodia's most popular singer and songwriter. Nevertheless, his popularity did not eclipse that of other recording artists such as Eum Song Seurm and Huoy Meas. He collaborated directly with Mao Sareth and Chounn Malay, among others. He also wrote songs for, and duetted with, other popular Cambodian singers to nurture their careers. For example, starting in the mid-1960s he recorded many popular duets with Pen Ran.

Sisamouth is credited with launching the career of Ros Serey Sothea, who had been singing at weddings and later became the leading female singer in the Cambodian rock scene. Sisamouth and Sothea recorded many very popular duets from the mid-1960s into the early 1970s. In later years, Sisamouth contributed songs to the soundtracks for a number of popular Cambodian films, such as Orn Euy Srey Orn, Tep Sodachan, and Thavory Meas Bong.

Sisamouth's highly prolific songwriting became well known during this period; he is confirmed to have written more than one thousand songs for himself and others (see Sinn Sisamouth discography), and the true total may be considerably higher. His son Sinn Chanchhaya believed that Sisamouth wrote roughly one song for every day that he was a professional musician, a period of nearly 20 years. In 1973 the music publisher Kruorch Bunlyhe issued A Collection of Sentimental Songs, which contained 500 of Sinn Sisamouth's songs.

He was also known to adapt popular Western pop and rock songs with new Khmer lyrics, such as a song based on Santana's "Black Magic Woman" called "Srolanh Srey Touch" (translated as "I Love Petite Girls" in English-language compilations); plus covers of "Hey Jude" by The Beatles (titled "Always Will Hope"), "A Whiter Shade of Pale" by Procol Harum (titled "Apart from Love"), and "Love Potion No. 9" by The Searchers (titled "Other Than You"). By the 1970s he was working regularly with lyricist Voy Ho, and had adapted some traditional and popular Thai songs into his repertoire (for example, "Promden Jet" with Ros Serey Sothea).

During the Cambodian Civil War in the early 1970s, Sisamouth was a supporter of the Khmer Republic military and recorded patriotic songs supporting the Republic's stance against the Khmer Rouge insurgents. His career would continue until the Khmer Rouge captured Phnom Penh in April 1975.

Disappearance and death
Sinn Sisamouth disappeared during the Khmer Rouge genocide and his exact fate has never been confirmed, with multiple sources making contradictory claims. Due to his ongoing popularity with the Cambodian people, there has been a great amount of speculation about his whereabouts after the Khmer Rouge forced the evacuation of all residents from Phnom Penh on April 17, 1975, and his apparent death at the hands of the new regime. In the film Don't Think I've Forgotten, an interview subject speculates that Sisamouth was originally evacuated to a small village but was then ordered to return to the city to work for the Khmer Rouge in some capacity, but it is unknown if he in fact followed this plan.

Also in Don't Think I've Forgotten, Sisamouth's son states that many different people have given him contradictory stories of his father's death. Like many of his contemporaries, as a popular musician with Western influences, qualities widely known to be disdained by the Khmer Rouge, Sisamouth was likely to have been targeted for imprisonment or execution immediately.

A popular but apocryphal story claims that Sisamouth was about to be executed by a Khmer Rouge firing squad but requested the opportunity to sing one last song in an attempt to appeal to the soldiers' emotions, but they executed him anyhow. In 2006, Khmer Apsara magazine granted a long interview to a man named Keo Chamnab who claims to have seen Sisamouth's execution at a jail in Prek Ta Duong village in 1976.

In 2009, Sisamouth's son claimed to know the name of his father's executioner and that the person was still alive. Whatever the cause, Sisamouth almost certainly died during the Khmer Rouge regime but his remains have never been discovered.

Legacy

Many of Sinn Sisamouth's master recordings were either destroyed by the Khmer Rouge regime in its efforts to eliminate foreign influences from Cambodian society, or were lost due to decay. However, collectors and entrepreneurs located and reproduced copies of some of his recordings after the fall of the Khmer Rouge in 1979. Some of his songs have been covered by modern Cambodian singers, such as "Srey Sros Khmeng" by Suong Chantha in 2002. Western listeners were introduced to his work starting in the late 1990s with the release of the Cambodian Rocks bootleg album, followed by the soundtrack to the film City of Ghosts.

Because his influence on Cambodian music was so great, Sisamouth is still a household name in Cambodia and remains popular to this day. He is extensively profiled in the 2015 documentary film on the history of Cambodian popular music, Don't Think I've Forgotten, in which several interview subjects describe Sisamouth as the most important Cambodian musician of all time. The film takes its title from a Sisamouth song. Often called the "King of Khmer music," "the Cambodian Elvis," or the "golden voice," his lasting cultural impact is difficult to overstate.

While Sisamouth is believed to have written well over one thousand songs, most have been lost while others that survived were copied and sold without any benefits going to his family. Cambodia passed its first copyright law in 2003, allowing families to claim the artists' intellectual property for the first time. In 2014, Sisamouth's family provided proof of composition and was awarded copyright ownership for over 180 songs. The event was commemorated with a celebration and tribute concert. However, the nation of Cambodia has also claimed Sisamouth's songs as state property, in another indication of his popularity and influence.

Sisamouth's son Sinn Chanchhaya became a singer for the Cambodian Radio, though he admitted he could not be compared to his father. Chanchhaya died in 2015. A tribute concert titled "It's Time to Give Back: A Tribute to the Golden Voice of Cambodia," promoting Sisamouth's music and the need for intellectual property benefits for his family and the families of his contemporaries, was held in Phnom Penh in November 2015.

Documentary filmmakers Chris G. Parkhurst and Stephanie Vincenti are currently in post-production on a feature-length documentary about Sinn Sisamouth called Elvis of Cambodia. The film will make use of rare archival footage and interviews with Sisamouth's surviving contemporaries, while exploring his continuing popularity with the people of Cambodia. As of 2019, the filmmakers are seeking funding to complete the production.

See also
Sinn Sisamouth discography

Notes

References

External links
Don't Think I've Forgotten – A documentary about the Khmer rock and roll scene.
Sinn Sisamouth Documentary

20th-century Cambodian male singers
Cambodian people of Laotian descent
Male singer-songwriters
Khmer people
People from Stung Treng province
People who died in the Cambodian genocide